Suzhou Dushu Lake Higher Education Town is a university town located in the Southern part of Suzhou Industrial Park, Suzhou, Jiangsu, to the East of Dushu Lake, and to the South of Wusong River. It has a total area of 25 km2, and expects to have around 400,000 people by 2016, 100,000 of whom will be students. Its goal is to offer good education, advanced technology, and a pleasant living environment. The area is home to many universities (undergraduate as well as graduate schools) including local Chinese universities and universities from other countries. This community focuses on producing educated and creative people. The area offers facilities including libraries, entertainment venues, parks, a sports centre and accommodation. Wenxing Plaza and Hanlin Plaza are popular locations of many small restaurants and shops. Dushu Lake Library is an experimental library of the National Digital Library.

Xi'an Jiaotong-Liverpool University

In May 2006, Suzhou Industrial Park's Higher Education Town became the location for the first Sino-British University to be approved by the Chinese Ministry of Education when, in partnership with Xi’an Jiaotong University, the University of Liverpool opened a joint University known as the Xi’an Jiaotong-Liverpool University (XJTLU). This is an independent University, offering degree courses in Architecture, Electronics, Communications, Computer Science, and Management (including Financial Mathematics and E-commerce). When fully operational, this independent university will have a student population of up to ten thousand.

Schools

Universities
Renmin University of China Suzhou Campus (Sino-French Institute, International College)
Dushu Lake Campus, Soochow University
Suzhou Graduate School of Nanjing University
Xi'an Jiaotong-Liverpool University
Skema Business School
Southeast University-Monash University Joint Graduate School
University of Dayton China Institute

Institutes
National University of Singapore (Suzhou) Research Institute
Suzhou Institute for Advanced Study, University of Science and Technology of China
Research Institute of Southeast University in Suzhou
Xi'an Jiaotong University Suzhou Academy
Suzhou Institute of Shandong University
Suzhou Institute of Wuhan University
Suzhou Research Institute, Sichuan University
Suzhou Institute of Research, North China Electric Power University
Suzhou Research Center, University of Oxford
Suzhou Institute for Technology Advancement, University of California, Los Angeles

Other schools
Suzhou Industrial Park Institute of Services Outsourcing
Suzhou Pingtan School
The Industrial Technology School of Suzhou Industrial Park
Suzhou Global Institute of Software Technology
HKU SPACE Global College, Suzhou
Ulink College of Suzhou Industrial Park

References

Education in Suzhou
Suzhou Industrial Park